GA Zink and Sons Building is a heritage-listed retail building at 56 Oxford Street in the inner city Sydney suburb of Darlinghurst in the City of Sydney local government area of New South Wales, Australia. It was added to the New South Wales State Heritage Register on 2 April 1999.

History 

Tailoring business G. A. Zink & Sons was established in 1895 at 112 Oxford Street by Gustav A. Zink. The purpose-built premises at 56 Oxford Street were built around the first half of 1912 on a new block formed by the widening of Oxford Street. The building was later substantially renovated by his son, Frank, with a new shopfront and entrance porch designed by the shop fitting firm of H. & E. Sidgreaves and installed during the first half of 1938.

The business has continued at the 1912 location over several generations, experiencing booms in business in the interwar period and following World War II. Now Zink and Sons, it continues to be operated by the Zink family.

Description

A three-storey Federation commercial building, with a symmetrical Inter War Functionalist shopfront with recessed central porch that has a polychrome terrazzo floor. The display windows on either side are surrounded by black Vitrolite relieved by two fine stainless steel strips. The name of the store is located in the hamper and consists of large individual stainless steel lettering in a stylised "modern" letter face. Other lettering includes the street number mounted at the top of the display windows.

The ground floor and first floor contains a large amount of early fabric, much of it dating from the 1920s including shelving, cabinetry, stairs and balustrades, etched glazing, partitions and leadlight glazing.

Significance

No 56 Oxford Street is part of an architecturally consistent group of buildings that were the result of the resumption and widening of Oxford Street between Whitlam and Taylor Square.

It is an exceptional and rare example of an Inter-War Functionalist style shopfront that is substantially intact, while the façade of the building at first and second floors incorporates finely detailed signage from the Federation era that is fully integrated with the fabric of the façade. The ground and first floor interior, despite modifications is a remarkably intact and rare example of a purpose designed 1920s shop interior. It is the only building on the northern side of Oxford Street that was purpose designed for a specific tenancy, GA Zink and Co, which has retained this original connection.

Heritage listing 
GA Zink & Sons Building was listed on the New South Wales State Heritage Register on 2 April 1999.

References

External links

Attribution 
 
 

New South Wales State Heritage Register
Darlinghurst, New South Wales
Retail buildings in New South Wales
Articles incorporating text from the New South Wales State Heritage Register
Buildings and structures completed in 1912